The  is a seven-seat MPV built by Mitsubishi Motors between 2003 and 2011. It was introduced to replace the Chariot/Space Wagon/Nimbus minivans. It was also marketed as the Mitsubishi Space Wagon in Thailand.

Overview 

The Grandis was launched on 14 May 2003 and sold in Japan, Asia, Europe, Oceania, Mexico, Honduras, Jamaica and South America.

The exterior styling was based loosely on designer Olivier Boulay's earlier Mitsubishi Space Liner, a monobox four-seat concept vehicle with centre opening "suicide doors", first exhibited at the Tokyo Motor Show in October 2001.

It was the first all new vehicle featuring the company's new common "face", comprising a curved lower grille edge and a sharp crease rising up the leading edge of the bonnet from the prominent corporate badge. It shared its platform with the Mitsubishi Airtrek, minus the increased ground clearance.

The Grandis was also the basis for the Mitsubishi FCV (Fuel Cell Vehicle) concept, powered by a fuel cell technology developed by then controlling shareholder DaimlerChrysler. DCX's "FC System" uses a fuel cell stack to replenish an array of NiMH batteries from 117 litres of compressed hydrogen storage.

The Grandis was launched in Malaysia on 28 July 2005 in conjunction with Mitsubishi's return to Malaysia. The Grandis was updated in Malaysia in September 2007, July 2009 and in August 2010.

It won the Best MPV award at the Bangkok International Motor Show from 2005 to 2010. During March 2009, it saw the cancellation of this model in the Japanese market. For 2011, it was discontinued globally.

Powertrain 
Engines available were a 2.4-litre four-cylinder and a Europe-only Volkswagen sourced 2.0-litre turbodiesel, badged DI-D rather than TDI as Volkswagen denotes it. The diesel model arrived in conjunction with the Grandis' European launch in 2004. It originally used the  BSY version of Volkswagen's Common Rail diesel engine; in 2008 it was changed to the  BWC variant of the same with no declared performance changes.

Annual production and sales

(source: Facts & Figures 2008, Facts & Figures 2009, Mitsubishi Motors website)

References 

Grandis
Cars introduced in 2003
2010s cars
Minivans
Front-wheel-drive vehicles